Ian Russell Chapman (born 31 May 1970) is an English former professional footballer. Born in Brighton, he spent most of his career with hometown club Brighton & Hove Albion.

Playing career
As a schoolboy, Chapman was chosen to attend the Football Association's School of Excellence at Lilleshall Hall. When he made his professional debut for Brighton & Hove Albion away to Birmingham City in February 1987, he became the first former pupil of the school to play in the Football League, in addition to being Brighton's youngest ever peacetime player. He went on to make 281 Football League appearances for the "Seagulls". He was part of the team which made the final of the Second Division play-offs in 1991, but during his time at the Goldstone Ground Brighton also twice suffered relegation, and dropped into the Football League Third Division in 1996. Immediately after Brighton's relegation, he was transferred to Gillingham, who had just gained promotion from the Third Division. He only made 23 League appearances for the "Gills", however, before he was forced to retire from professional football due to injuries.  He finished his playing career with non-league club Whitehawk of the Sussex County League. In 1999, he made one last bid to return to professional football when he had a trial with former club Brighton, but his injury problems prevented him gaining a contract with the club.

Managerial career
Chapman became manager of Whitehawk at the start of the 2001–02 season, initially as player-manager. In October 2006 he returned to former club Brighton in a coaching role, initially in a part-time capacity while remaining manager of Whitehawk.  At the end of the 2006–07 season he dedicated himself to the job at Brighton full-time, resigning from his job with Whitehawk. He left his job at Brighton in 2008, however, after the departure of Dean Wilkins, the manager who had brought him to the club. He was said to be in the running to take over as manager of Isthmian League team Crowborough Athletic, but was not offered the job.

He later coached Conference National strugglers Lewes on a casual basis while looking for another full-time job in the sport. In 2012, he joined Isthmian League side Burgess Hill Town as manager.

References

Living people
1970 births
Footballers from Brighton
Brighton & Hove Albion F.C. players
Gillingham F.C. players
English footballers
Association football defenders
Whitehawk F.C. players
English Football League players
English football managers
Isthmian League managers
Whitehawk F.C. managers